Cormac McLoughlin-Gavin (born 30 April 1994) is an Irish cricketer. He made his first-class debut for Leinster Lightning in the 2019 Inter-Provincial Championship on 18 June 2019. He made his Twenty20 debut for Munster Reds in the 2020 Inter-Provincial Trophy on 20 August 2020. He made his List A debut on 6 May 2021, for Munster Reds in the 2021 Inter-Provincial Cup.

References

External links
 

1994 births
Living people
Irish cricketers
Place of birth missing (living people)
Leinster Lightning cricketers
Munster Reds cricketers